Jocelyn Ho (born May 30, 1987 in Etobicoke, Ontario) is a Canadian-Taiwanese figure skater. She is the 2006 Taiwanese national silver medalist. Her programs are choreographed by David Wilson.

Results

External links
 

1987 births
Living people
Sportspeople from Etobicoke
Taiwanese female single skaters
Canadian female single skaters
Canadian people of Taiwanese descent